This is a list giving breakdowns of the members serving in the European Parliamentary session from 2004 to 2009, following the 2004 election. For a full single list, see: List of members of the European Parliament 2004–2009.

MEPs
MEPs for Austria 2004–2009
MEPs for Belgium 2004–2009
MEPs for Bulgaria 2007–2009
MEPs for Bulgaria 2007 (delegation)
MEPs for Cyprus 2004–2009
MEPs for the Czech Republic 2004–2009
MEPs for Denmark 2004–2009
MEPs for Estonia 2004–2009
MEPs for Finland 2004–2009
MEPs for France 2004–2009
MEPs for Germany 2004–2009
MEPs for Greece 2004–2009
MEPs for Hungary 2004–2009
MEPs for Ireland 2004–2009
MEPs for Italy 2004–2009
MEPs for Latvia 2004–2009
MEPs for Lithuania 2004–2009
MEPs for Luxembourg 2004–2009
MEPs for Malta 2004–2009
List of members of the European Parliament for the Netherlands, 2004–2009
MEPs for Poland 2004–2009
MEPs for Portugal 2004–2009
MEPs for Romania 2007–2009
MEPs for Romania 2007 (delegation)
MEPs for Slovakia 2004–2009
MEPs for Slovenia 2004–2009
MEPs for Spain 2004–2009
MEPs for Sweden 2004–2009
MEPs for the United Kingdom 2004–2009

Observers
Observers for Bulgaria 2005–2006
Observers for Romania 2005–2006